Nekiambé Marius Mbaiam (born 1 June 1987) is a Chadian professional footballer who plays as a striker or midfielder in the Championnat National 3 for Besançon Football. At international level, he represented the Chad national team.

Club career
Mbaiam was born in Moundou, Chad. transferred from Grenoble Foot to CS Louhans-Cuiseaux in June 2007. After two years and nine matches, with two scored goals, in summer 2009 he signed for Gap FC. From 2017, he is a member of Besançon Football.

International career
Mbaiam made his international debut on 12 October 2003 and was member of the Chad national football team at 2007 CEMAC Cup. He was the part of the team for Fifa World Cup 2006 qualifiers, and Fifa World Cup 2010 qualifiers. Mbaiam scored his first goal on 6 September 2008 against Sudan national football team. He was national team captain.

International goals

See also
 List of Chad international footballers

References

1987 births
Living people
People from Logone Occidental Region
Chadian footballers
Chad international footballers
Association football midfielders
Grenoble Foot 38 players
Louhans-Cuiseaux FC players
Gap HAFC players
US Orléans players
Jura Sud Foot players
ASM Belfort players
Ligue 2 players
Championnat National players
Chadian expatriate sportspeople in France
Expatriate footballers in France